The Hans von Bülow Medal is awarded by the Berlin Philharmonic Orchestra to outstanding musicians close to the orchestra. The medal is named after its first Chief Conductor, Hans von Bülow.

 Mariss Jansons, conductor. 2003
 Nikolaus Harnoncourt, conductor. 1999
 Hans Werner Henze, composer. 1997
 Claudio Abbado, conductor
 Wolfgang Sawallisch, conductor. 2003
 Georg Solti, conductor. 1993
 Alfred Brendel, pianist. 1992
 Yehudi Menuhin, violinist and conductor. 1979
 Claudio Arrau, pianist. 1978
 Eugen Jochum, conductor
 Herbert von Karajan, conductor
 Zubin Mehta, conductor
 Daniel Barenboim, conductor and pianist
 Seiji Ozawa, conductor
 Bernard Haitink, conductor
 Günter Wand, conductor
 Lorin Maazel, conductor
 Lovro von Matačić, conductor

and others.

References

German music awards